South Branch French Creek is a 24.2-mile (38.9 km) long tributary to French Creek in Erie County, Pennsylvania.  It is classed as a 3rd order stream on the EPA waters geoviewer site.

Course
South Branch French Creek rises in Concord Township of southeastern Erie County, Pennsylvania and flows south towards Corry, Pennsylvania then turns west towards Union City, Pennsylvania.  Many tributaries feed into it on its way to French Creek west of Union City.

Watershed
South Branch French Creek drains 81.3 square miles of Erie Drift Plain (glacial geology).  The watershed receives an average of 47.7 in/year of precipitation and has a wetness index of 457.08.

Tributaries

See also 
 List of rivers of Pennsylvania
 List of tributaries of the Allegheny River

References

Rivers of Pennsylvania
Tributaries of the Allegheny River
Rivers of Erie County, Pennsylvania